Ernest Calvin Beisner (born 6 December 1955) is an American Christian interdisciplinary scholar and writer in the fields of theology, Christian apologetics, church history, political philosophy, and environmental ethics and stewardship. He is the founder and national spokesman of the Cornwall Alliance for the Stewardship of Creation.

Beisner earned a B.A. in Interdisciplinary Studies in Religion and Philosophy from the University of Southern California in 1978, an M.A. in Society with Specialization in Economic Ethics from International College, Los Angeles in 1983, and a Ph.D. in Scottish History with a dissertation on the life and political thought of the 17th-century Scottish Covenanter lawyer and politician Sir James Stewart of Goodtrees (1635-1713) from the University of St. Andrews in 2003. He taught interdisciplinary studies at Covenant College from 1992 to 2000 and historical theology and social ethics at Knox Theological Seminary from 2000 to 2008. He has been a fellow of the Institute on Religion and Democracy and an adjunct fellow of the Acton Institute for the Study of Religion and Liberty. Beisner has been an elder in both the Presbyterian Church in America and the Orthodox Presbyterian Church, and is a former editor of Discipleship Journal.

Beisner believes that environmental stewardship consistent with Christian worldview, theology, and ethics involves people working together to enhance the fruitfulness, the beauty, and the safety of the earth, to the glory of God and the benefit of their neighbors, thus addressing the two Great Commandments to love God and to love neighbor. The Heritage Foundation gave him the "Outstanding Spokesperson for Faith, Science, and Stewardship" award at the Heartland Institute's Ninth International Conference on Climate Change in 2014. His biography at the Cornwall Alliance's website states that he has lectured at universities, seminaries, conferences, and churches in North America, Europe, Africa, and Asia; testified as an expert witness on the ethics and economics of climate change and climate and energy policy before committees of the U.S. Senate and House of Representatives; briefed the White House Council on Environmental Policy; and presented a paper to a scholarly colloquium on climate change of the Pontifical Institute for Justice and Peace at the Vatican in Rome in 2007. He is a frequent guest on Christian secular radio talk shows.

Bibliography
 The Teachings of Witness Lee and the Local Church, 1977
 Is Baptism Necessary for Salvation?, 1980
 God in Three Persons, 1984, 2004
 Answers for Atheists, Agnostics, and Other Thoughtful Skeptics, 1985, 1993 (also published in Russian, Estonian, and Korean)
 Psalms of Promise: Celebrating the Majesty and Faithfulness of God, 1988, 1994
 Prosperity and Poverty: The Compassionate Use of Resources in a World of Scarcity, 1988, 2001
 Prospects for Growth: A Biblical View of Population, Resources, and the Future, 1990, 2004
 Man, Economy, and the Environment in Biblical Perspective: The 1991 Staley Distinguished Christian Scholar Lectures at Covenant College, 1994
 Evangelical Heathenism: Examining Contemporary Revivalism, 1996
 Where Garden Meets Wilderness: Evangelical Entry into the Environmental Debate, 1997
 "Jesus Only" Churches, 1998
 What Is the Most Important Environmental Task Facing American Christians Today?, 2008, revised 2014
 Social Justice vs. Biblical Justice: How Good Intentions Undermine Justice and Gospel, 2013, revised 2018
 What Can Theology Say to Science about Climate Change?, 2014
 Is Capitalism Bad for the Environment?, 2017

References

Living people
1955 births
American Christian theologians
University of Southern California alumni
Alumni of the University of St Andrews
Editors of Christian publications